Jeremy Chaim Stein (born October 17, 1960) is an American macroeconomist and the Moise Y. Safra Professor of Economics at Harvard University; he also chaired Harvard's economics department. He served as a member of the Federal Reserve Board of Governors from 2012 to 2014. Stein works as an investment industry consultant and served as president of the American Finance Association in 2008.

Early life and education
Stein was born to a secular Jewish family, the son of mathematician Elias M. Stein and Elly Intrator. Both his parents were Jewish refugees during World War II who immigrated to the United States. He graduated summa cum laude with an A.B. in economics from Princeton University in 1983 after completing a 118-page senior thesis titled "Pseudo-Securities: An Analysis of Financially Hedged Positions." While at Princeton, he was co-captain of the men's gymnastics team, specializing in rings. In 1986, he earned a PhD in economics from MIT. His 1998 paper "Risk management, capital budgeting, and capital structure policy for financial institutions: an integrated approach" with Kenneth A. Froot won the Jensen Prize.

Career
After serving a one-year internship at Goldman Sachs Group Inc., he became an assistant professor of finance at the Harvard Business School from 1987-1990, and finance faculty of MIT’s Sloan School of Management for ten years after that. Stein rejoined Harvard in 2000.

Stein received the Fama-DFA Prize, which is an annual prize given to authors with the best capital markets and asset pricing research papers published in the Journal of Financial Economics for 2002.

He designed quantitative asset-management strategies for Guggenheim Partners from 2005 to 2007, was also a senior adviser to the Treasury secretary and was on the staff at the National Economic Council in 2009.

Federal Reserve Board
On December 27, 2011, President Barack Obama announced that he planned to nominate Stein to fill one of the two vacancies on the seven-member Federal Reserve Board. Stein's nomination was filibustered by Republicans in the United States Senate. On May 15, 2012, Senate Majority Leader Harry Reid motioned to invoke cloture and break the filibuster on both the nominations of Stein and of Powell.  On May 17, 2012, a Senate floor vote was held on Stein's nomination with a required 60-vote threshold for confirmation.  Senators voted 70-24 to confirm Stein.

On April 3, 2014, Stein announced that he would resign his position at the Federal Reserve and return to Harvard in May.

After the Fed 

In addition to the post at Harvard, in March 2015, Stein began working as a consultant for hedge fund BlueMountain Capital.

Research 

Stein's research covers subjects including behavioral finance and market efficiency; corporate investment and financing decisions; risk management; capital allocation inside firms; banking; financial regulation; and monetary policy. 

Stein worked as a research associate at the National Bureau of Economic Research. He is also a member of the American Academy of Arts and Sciences.

Personal life
Stein is divorced with three children and lives in Boston.  His daughter Carolyn is an economist at the University of California, Berkeley. He is a registered Democrat.

References

External links
 Statements and Speeches of Jeremy C. Stein

1960 births
20th-century American economists
21st-century American economists
American people of Belgian-Jewish descent
Economists from Illinois
Federal Reserve System governors
Fellows of the American Academy of Arts and Sciences
Fellows of the Econometric Society
Financial economists
Harvard University faculty
Living people
MIT School of Humanities, Arts, and Social Sciences alumni
Princeton University alumni
Writers from Chicago
Obama administration personnel
Presidents of the American Finance Association